This is a list of episodes for the machinima comedy  web series The Strangerhood, created and produced by Rooster Teeth Productions.

Series overview

Episodes

Season 1 (2004–2006) 
One morning in the near future, a group of assorted stereotypes awake in a strange town with no memory of who they are or where they came from. Their only clues come from the assorted labels that hold their names (Wade's name badge and Sam's underwear) and a mysteriously creepy voice issuing from their televisions. Over the course of the season, they endure many trials including an unusual reality show kitchen task, a murder mystery among their group, a secret affair and of course their own strange personalities before they learn the horrifying truth behind the unusual events of the Strangerhood.

Season 2 (2015) 
As a part of their Indiegogo crowdfunding campaign for their film Lazer Team, Rooster Teeth created a stretch goal that if surpassed they would produce a second season of the show. The goal was surpassed and a second season was produced as promised.

Special episodes

Strangerhood Studios (2005)
Strangerhood Studios is a series of shorts, each about one or two minutes long, featuring the characters of The Strangerhood. The story, however, departs from the main plot of The Strangerhood. For example, the characters are back in the outside world, not trapped on Strangerhood Lane. Strangerhood Studios was created when the Independent Film Channel asked Rooster Teeth Productions and machinima artist Paul Marino to create six shorts for television broadcast.

Only Sam, Dutchmiller, and Catherine from the original cast have recurring roles. Wade is seen in a potential promotional poster as the "funny sidekick"; he also appears in another poster for a romance-themed pitch, along with Tovar. Nikki is mentioned in a phone conversation. Starting from episode 4, every Strangerhood character, except for Tovar, appear in the mini-series.

References

External links

RoosterTooths.com – an unofficial The Strangerhood  resource website

Strangerhood, The
Strangerhood episodes, The